Namonuito Atoll, also called Namonweito, Weito, or Magur Islands, is the largest atoll of the Federated States of Micronesia and of the Caroline Islands with a total area of , unless one considers the still larger Chuuk (Truk) Lagoon as a type of atoll in an early stage of development. In Micronesia, only Kwajalein Atoll of the Marshall Islands is still larger.

It is roughly triangular in shape, with the base running  along its southern side. 

The southwest corner of the triangle is marked by Ulul islet, the main island (largest and most populated), also called Onoun. 

The other islets lie mostly on the northeast side, from Pisaras islet in the southeast corner to Magur (Makur) islet in the north corner. The 12 islets have an aggregate land area of only . The total population is 1,341 (census of 2000).

The reef rim of the atoll is submerged for the greater part and is marked by the lighter colour of the water over it. The reef appears to be in the process of formation and can be crossed at many places. The lagoon is not of uniform depth.

Pisaras Island has coconut palms and other trees growing on it. Reefs extend northwest and west-northwest from the island, enclosing a shallow and foul bay. Ulul Island is densely covered with coconut
palms. A drying reef fringes the island. There is a radio station on the island.

The atoll is home to five of the 40 municipalities of Chuuk state, listed in counterclockwise sequence, with population (2000):

History
Namonuito was first visited by Spanish explorers on the galleon San Jerónimo on 5 July 1566. At Pisaras Island, the rebel pilot Lope Martín and his gang of mutineers (thirteen soldiers and thirteen sailors) murdered Captain Pero Sánchez Pericón and other expedition members, and were subsequently marooned.

Onou Island was later visited by Spanish naval officer Juan Antonio de Ibargoitia commanding the vessel Filipino in 1801 who charted it as Anonima (Anonymous).

Onoun Airfield

Onoun Airfield is located on the west side of the atoll. Caroline Islands Air has chartered service. Aircraft land on a  chipseal runway.

References

External links 
 Sailing Directions (enroute), page 263
 exact islet coordinates
 historic census data, population densities
 about Juan Antonio de Ibargoitia

Atolls of the Federated States of Micronesia
Chuuk State